Sep. 1 - Eastern Orthodox liturgical calendar - Sep. 3

All fixed commemorations below celebrated on September 15 by Orthodox Churches on the Old Calendar.

For September 2nd, Orthodox Churches on the Old Calendar commemorate the Saints listed on August 20.

Saints
 Righteous Eleazar, son of Righteous Aaron, and Righteous Phineas (c. 1400 B.C.)
 Martyrs Mamas of Caesarea in Cappadocia, and his parents, Theodotus and Rufina (3rd century)
 3,628 Martyrs at Nicomedia (303-305)  (see also: September 4)
 Martyr Diomedes, by the sword.
 Martyr Julian, beaten to death.
 Martyr Philip, by the sword.
 Martyr Eutychianos, roasted alive on a gridiron.
 Martyr Hesychius, by hanging.
 Martyr Leonides, by fire.
 Martyr Eutychios, by crucifixion.
 Martyr Philadelphos, by tying a heavy stone around his neck.
 Martyr Melanippos, by fire. 
 Martyr Parthagape, by drowning.
 Martyrs of Aeithalas and Ammon of Adrianople, Thrace, by severe whipping.
 Saint John the Faster, Patriarch of Constantinople (595)
 Saint Kosmas the Hermit and Confessor, of Crete (658)

Pre-Schism Western saints
 Saint Antoninus of Pamiers, an early martyr at Pamiers in France.
 Saint Maxima, a Roman slave who was scourged to death in Rome, condemned to death together with St Ansanus (304)
 Saint Justus of Lyon, Bishop of Lyon (390)
 Saint Valentine, fourth Bishop of Strasbourg in France (4th century)
 Saint Castor of Apt, Bishop of Apt (c. 420)
 Saint Elpidius, Bishop of Lyon, Confessor (422)
 Saint Nonnosus, a monk at the monastery of Mt Soracte in Italy; his wonderful deeds were recorded by St Gregory the Great (c. 575)
 Saint Hieu, Abbess of Tadcaster, England (c. 657)
 Saint Agricola of Avignon (Agricolus), Bishop of Avignon (c. 700)
 Saint Lolanus, a bishop in Scotland (c. 1034)

Post-Schism Orthodox saints
 Saints Anthony (1073) and Theodosius (1074), founders of the Kiev Monastery of the Caves and monasticism in Rus'.

New martyrs and confessors
 New Hieromartyr Barsanuphius (Lebedev), Bishop of Kyrillov (1918) 
 New Hieromartyr John Ivanov, Priest (1918) 
 New Martyr Seraphima (Sulimova), Abbess of the Therapontov Convent (1918) 
 New Martyrs Anatoly Barashkov, Nicholas Burlakov, Michael Trubnikov, and Philip Marishev, at the St. Cyril of White Lake Monastery (1918)
 New Hieromartyr Damascene (Tsedrik), Bishop of Starodub (1937)
 New Hieromartyrs Ephemius Goryachev, John Melnichenko, John Smolichev, Vladimir Morinsky, Victor Basov, Basil Zelensky, Theodotus Shatokhin, Peter Novoselsky, Stephen Yaroshevich, Priests (1937) 
 New Hieromartyr Herman (Ryashentsev), Bishop of Vyaznikov (1937)
 New Hieromartyr Stephen Ermolin, Priest (1937)
 Martyr Paul Elkyn (1937) 
 Virgin-martyr Xenia (1937)

Other commemorations
 "Kaluga" Icon of the Most Holy Theotokos (1771) 
 Translation of the relics (1796) of Venerable Theodosius, Abbot of Totma (1568) 
 Synaxis of the Saints of Saratov. 
 Repose of Archbishop Vladimir (Petrov) of Kazan (1897)

Icon gallery

Notes

References

Sources
 September 2/September 15. Orthodox Calendar (PRAVOSLAVIE.RU).
 September 15 / September 2. HOLY TRINITY RUSSIAN ORTHODOX CHURCH (A parish of the Patriarchate of Moscow).
 September 2. OCA - The Lives of the Saints.
 The Autonomous Orthodox Metropolia of Western Europe and the Americas (ROCOR). St. Hilarion Calendar of Saints for the year of our Lord 2004. St. Hilarion Press (Austin, TX). p. 65.
 The Second Day of the Month of September. Orthodoxy in China.
 September 2. Latin Saints of the Orthodox Patriarchate of Rome.
 The Roman Martyrology. Transl. by the Archbishop of Baltimore. Last Edition, According to the Copy Printed at Rome in 1914. Revised Edition, with the Imprimatur of His Eminence Cardinal Gibbons. Baltimore: John Murphy Company, 1916. pp. 267–279.
 Rev. Richard Stanton. A Menology of England and Wales, or, Brief Memorials of the Ancient British and English Saints Arranged According to the Calendar, Together with the Martyrs of the 16th and 17th Centuries. London: Burns & Oates, 1892. p. 434.

 Greek Sources
 Great Synaxaristes:  2 ΣΕΠΤΕΜΒΡΙΟΥ. ΜΕΓΑΣ ΣΥΝΑΞΑΡΙΣΤΗΣ.
  Συναξαριστής. 2 Σεπτεμβρίου. ECCLESIA.GR. (H ΕΚΚΛΗΣΙΑ ΤΗΣ ΕΛΛΑΔΟΣ).
  02/09/. Ορθόδοξος Συναξαριστής.
 Russian Sources
  15 сентября (2 сентября). Православная Энциклопедия под редакцией Патриарха Московского и всея Руси Кирилла (электронная версия). (Orthodox Encyclopedia - Pravenc.ru).
  2 сентября по старому стилю / 15 сентября по новому стилю. Русская Православная Церковь - Православный церковный календарь на  год.

September in the Eastern Orthodox calendar